"For Your Love" is a song written and performed by Ed Townsend. It reached #7 on the US R&B chart and #13 on the Billboard Hot 100 in 1958.

Other charting versions
The Righteous Brothers released a version of the song as a single in 1965 that reached #103 on the Billboard chart.
Peaches & Herb released a version of the song as a single in 1967 that reached #10 on the R&B chart and #20 on the Billboard chart.
Bobby Austin released a version of the song as a single in 1970 that reached #65 on the country chart.
Gwen McCrae released a version of the song as a single in 1973 that reached #17 on the R&B chart.
Bobby Lewis released a version of the song as a single in 1976 that reached #52 on the country chart.

Other versions
Prentice Moreland released a version of the song as the B-side to his 1962 single "Lover Supreme".
Joe Tex released a version of the song as a single in Italy in 1967.
Carla Thomas released a version of the song as a single as part of her Carla EP in 1967.
Frankie Avalon  released a version of the song as a single in 1969.
Houston Person released a version of the song as the B-side to his 1970 single "Wadin" and was featured on his album, Truth!
The Supremes and Four Tops released a version of the song on their 1970 album, ''The Magnificent 7.
Cynthia Richards released a version of the song as a single in Jamaica in 1975.
Bruce Springsteen released a version of the song as a soundchecked track from the Nugs.net recording of his May 23, 1988 concert at Madison Square Garden in New York City.

References

1958 songs
1958 singles
1965 singles
1967 singles
1969 singles
1970 singles
1973 singles
1975 singles
1976 singles
Songs written by Ed Townsend
Ed Townsend songs
The Righteous Brothers songs
Peaches & Herb songs
Gwen McCrae songs
Bobby Lewis (country singer) songs
Joe Tex songs
Frankie Avalon songs
The Supremes songs
Four Tops songs
Capitol Records singles
Atlantic Records singles
Reprise Records singles